The 6th Politburo of the Lao People's Revolutionary Party (LPRP), officially the Political Bureau of the 6th Central Committee of the Lao People's Revolutionary Party, was elected in 1996 by the 1st Plenary Session of the 6th Central Committee, in the immediate aftermath of the 6th National Congress.

Members

References

Specific

Bibliography
Books:
 

6th Politburo of the Lao People's Revolutionary Party
1996 establishments in Laos
2001 disestablishments in Laos